This is a list of seasons completed by the BYU Cougars men's basketball team since the team's formation in 1902. They have been conference regular season champions 30 times and conference tournament champions 3 times. They have also appeared in 29 NCAA basketball tournaments, reaching the Elite Eight 3 times.

Seasons

  Adjusted record is 1–10 (25 wins and 1 loss vacated) and 0–5 (11 wins vacated) in conference. One win was not vacated; Nick Emery (the player who was ruled ineligible) did not play in one of BYU's wins.
  Adjusted record is 0–11 (22 wins and 1 loss vacated) and 0–6 (12 wins vacated) in conference.

References

 
Byu
BYU Cougars basketball seasons